The LCDR Aeolus class was a class of four  steam locomotives. They were supplied to the London, Chatham and Dover Railway (LCDR) by R. & W. Hawthorn & Co. acting as agents for Robert Stephenson & Co. which built the locomotives, but had subcontracted some components to Hawthorn. They were delivered to the LCDR between September 1860 and April 1861.

Like other LCDR locomotives delivered prior to 1874, the locomotives originally had no numbers, being distinguished by name. In November 1875, William Kirtley (who had replaced Martley following the latter's death in 1874) allotted the class letter S. The locomotives were then given the numbers 71–74.  During 1886–88, the locomotives were rebuilt with new boilers. They passed to the South Eastern and Chatham Railway (SECR) at the start of 1899, and their numbers were increased by 459 to avoid duplication with former South Eastern Railway locomotives. Withdrawal commenced in July 1905, but since all of their numbers were required for new locomotives of the SECR H class, the remaining locomotives were transferred to the duplicate list the same month, but only two are known to have been renumbered; the last was withdrawn in November 1909.

Notes

References

Aeolus
4-4-0 locomotives
2-4-0T locomotives
Railway locomotives introduced in 1860
Robert Stephenson and Company locomotives
Scrapped locomotives
Standard gauge steam locomotives of Great Britain